Hanna Hamdi (born 26 November 1995) is a Tunisian footballer who plays as a forward for German Frauen-Regionalliga club VfR Warbeyen and the Tunisia women's national team.

International career
Hamdi, who has dual German nationality, made her debut for the Tunisia national team on 10 June 2021, coming on as a substitute for Ella Kaabachi against Jordan. Three days after that, she scored her first goal for Tunisia, also against Jordan.

International goals
Scores and results list Tunisia's goal tally first

See also
List of Tunisia women's international footballers

References

External links

1995 births
Living people
Footballers from Tunis
Tunisian women's footballers
Women's association football forwards
Tunisia women's international footballers
Tunisian emigrants to Germany
Naturalized citizens of Germany
German women's footballers
MSV Duisburg (women) players
SGS Essen players
German people of Tunisian descent